Nicobar-class troopships are large multi-role troopships converted from merchant ships which were originally ordered by the Ministry of Shipping for service with the Shipping Corporation of India. These were later acquired by the Indian Navy for troop transport duties. The ships include large davits for Landing Craft Vehicle Personnel (LCVP) and also feature high bridge forward, funnel in the aft and a helicopter platform at the stern. This makes the vessels suitable for general purpose roles, other than just troop transport. The design of the Type B-561 ships built by Szczecin Shipyard of Poland was also sold to India for licensed construction.

Ships in the class

See also
List of active Indian Navy ships

References

Troop ships
Troop ships of India
Auxiliary transport ship classes